The 1922 Cambridge by-election was a by-election held on 16 March 1922 for the British House of Commons constituency of Cambridge.

The by-election was caused by the  resignation on 7 November 1921 of the town's Conservative Party Member of Parliament (MP) Sir Eric Geddes, who had held the seat since 1917, and had come under criticism as Minister of Transport for the scale of nationalisation he had overseen, and over charges of departmental inefficiency. He chose to resign as both cabinet minister and MP.

The result was a comfortable victory for the new Conservative candidate Sir George Newton, who held the seat until his elevation to the peerage in 1934 as Baron Eltisley. The election nonetheless saw a sharp fall in the Conservative share of the vote (by over one third) since the 'khaki election' of 1918, although the Conservative vote only actually fell by 656, and Newton's fall in vote share is mainly attributable by a slight rise in the Labour vote, and the appearance of the first Liberal candidate to contest the seat since 1910.

Of the two unsuccessful candidates, Hugh Dalton was a Cambridge-educated LSE lecturer in economics who went on to be an MP from 1924, and became Labour's Chancellor under Clement Attlee; and Sydney Cope Morgan was a Cambridge-educated barrister who went on to contest the seat again for the Liberals with an increased vote at each of the next two general elections.

All three candidates were contesting the seat for the first time, and Dalton would not contest the seat again.

Result of the previous general election in Cambridge

Result of 16 March 1922 by-election

References

See also 
 List of United Kingdom by-elections
 Cambridge constituency
 1934 Cambridge by-election
 1967 Cambridge by-election
 1976 Cambridge by-election

1922 in England
1922 elections in the United Kingdom
By-election, 1922
By-election, 1922
By-elections to the Parliament of the United Kingdom in Cambridgeshire constituencies
20th century in Cambridge